The Unforseen is a lost 1917 silent film drama directed by John B. O'Brien and starring Olive Tell and David Powell. It was distributed through the Mutual Film Company. It is based on a 1903 Broadway play, The Unforeseen(spelling of play varies from the film), by Robert Marshall.

Cast
Olive Tell - Margaret Fielding
David Powell - Walter Maxwell
Lionel Adams - Captain Richard Haynes
Fuller Mellish - Senator Fielding
Eileen Dennes - Ethel Fielding
Helen Courtney - Maxwell's secretary
Warburton Gamble - Henry Traquair

References

External links

1917 films
American silent feature films
Lost American films
American films based on plays
American black-and-white films
Silent American drama films
1917 drama films
1917 lost films
Lost drama films
Films directed by John B. O'Brien
1910s American films
1910s English-language films
English-language drama films